Provinces are the first level administrative divisions of Sri Lanka. Currently, Sri Lanka is divided into 9 provinces. Each province is further divided into districts, which are further divided into divisional secretariats.

The provinces were first established by the British rulers of Ceylon in 1833. Over the next century, most of the administrative functions of the provinces were transferred to the districts, the second level administrative division of the country. By the middle of the 20th century, the provinces had become mostly ceremonial. This changed in 1987 when, following several decades of increasing demand for decentralization, the 13th Amendment to the 1978 Constitution of Sri Lanka established provincial councils.

History

Anuradhapura Kingdom

In the Kingdom of Anuradhapura, Rajarata was the personal domain of the King. It was further divided in to four districts (Desa): Dakkina, Pachhima, Uttara and Pacina Desa.

British Ceylon

After the British took control of the entire island of Ceylon in 1815, it was divided into three ethnic-based administrative structures: Low Country Sinhalese, Kandyan Sinhalese and Tamil. In 1829, the British established the Colebrooke–Cameron Commission to review the colonial government of Ceylon, including its administrative structures. The commission recommended that the existing three ethnic based administrations be unified into a single administration divided into five geographic provinces. Accordingly, on 1 October 1833, five provinces under one administration came into being:

 Central Province – composed of the central Kandyan provinces.
 Eastern Province – composed of the maritime districts of Batticaloa and Trincomalee, and the Kandyan provinces of Bintenna and Tamankaduwa.
 Northern Province – composed of the maritime districts of Jaffna, Mannar and Vanni, and the Kandyan province of Nuwara Kalawiya.
 Southern Province – composed of the maritime districts of Galle, Hambantota, Matara and Tangalle, and the Kandyan provinces of Lower Uva, Saffragam and Wellassa.
 Western Province – composed of the maritime districts of Colombo, Chilaw and Puttalam, and the Kandyan provinces of Three Korales, Four Korales, Seven Korales and Lower Bulathgama.

Over the next fifty years, four additional provinces were created, bringing the total number up to nine:
 North Western Province – created in 1845 from northern parts of the Western Province (districts of Chilaw, Puttalam and Seven Korales).
 North Central Province – created in 1873 from southern parts of the Northern Province (district of Nuwara Kalawiya) and north western parts of the Eastern Province (district of Tamankaduwa).
 Uva Province – created in 1886 from parts of the Central Province, Eastern Province (district of Bintenna) and Southern Province (district of Wellassa).
 Sabaragamuwa Province – created in 1889.

Sri Lanka

The number of provinces remained static until September 1988 when, in accordance with the Indo-Lanka Accord, President J. R. Jayewardene issued proclamations enabling the Northern and Eastern provinces to be one administrative unit administered by one elected council, creating the North Eastern Province. The proclamations were only meant to be a temporary measure until a referendum was held in the Eastern Province on a permanent merger between the two provinces. However, the referendum was never held and successive Sri Lankan presidents issued proclamations annually extending the life of the "temporary" entity.

The merger was controversial and bitterly opposed by Sinhalese-speaking people, in particular. On 14 July 2006, after a long campaign against the merger, the JVP filed three separate petitions with the Supreme Court of Sri Lanka requesting a separate Provincial Council for the East. On 16 October 2006, the Supreme Court ruled that the proclamations issued by President Jayewardene were null and void and had no legal effect. The North Eastern Province was formally de-merged into the Northern and Eastern provinces on 1 January 2007.

Sri Lanka currently has nine provinces, seven of which have had provincial councils from the start.

List of provinces
All population data is from the most recent census of Sri Lanka, in 2012.

See also
 Provincial Governors of Sri Lanka
 Chief Ministers of Sri Lanka
 ISO 3166-2:LK

Notes

References

Bibliography

External links

 

 
1833 establishments in Ceylon
Sri Lanka 1
Decentralization
Provinces, Sri Lanka
Provinces
Sri Lanka geography-related lists